Wade Landing Mound is an archaeological site of the Coles Creek culture (700 to 1200 CE) in Caldwell Parish, Louisiana.

Description
Archaeologists have done core samples of the mound and determined that it was built in two stages. Combined with the core samples, ceramic analysis of artifacts found at the site have dated it to approximately 700–1200 CE. The mound has a historic period cemetery on its summit, which has prevented looting.

Location

See also
Culture, phase, and chronological table for the Mississippi Valley

References

External links
 Wade Landing Mound at waymarking.com

Archaeological sites of the Coles Creek culture
Mounds in Louisiana
Geography of Caldwell Parish, Louisiana